Csaba Kovacs (born 18 March 1984) is a Hungarian professional ice hockey player who is currently playing with Újpesti TE of the Erste Liga. He previously spent the entirety of his career with Alba Volán Székesfehérvár who competed in the Austrian Hockey League (EBEL) before joining MAC Budapest in 2016.

Career statistics

Austrian Hockey League

References

External links
 

1984 births
Fehérvár AV19 players
Hungarian ice hockey left wingers
Living people
MAC Budapest players
Újpesti TE (ice hockey) players
Ice hockey people from Budapest